Sacred space may refer to:

 Sacred architecture or religious architecture
 Hierotopy, the creation of sacred spaces
 Sacred space in Ganachakra or various tantric assemblies and feasts
 Sacred Space Music, the third album of Constance Demby
 Sacred Space (website), an Irish prayer website
 Sacred site  a location which is deemed to be sacred or hallowed.